

Incumbents
 Monarch: Harald V
 Prime Minister: Jens Stoltenberg

Events

January

 January 1 – The Agency for Public Management and eGovernment is established.
 January 1 – Nordic Battlegroup consisting of military forces from Sweden, Finland, Norway, Republic of Ireland, and Estonia under the control of the European Union, is established.
 January 1 – Mercury becomes banned from use in Norway.
 January 11 – Norwegian police announce that they have arrested a 55-year-old man suspected of being the sexual predator known as The Pocket Man.
 13 January – A school in Lørenskog is closed after threats of a school shooting came from a video on YouTube. A 15-year-old was arrested for the threat.
 January 21 – The OBX Index drops 6.4%, then the second biggest fall since August 1991 and the third largest in its history.

February

 February 5 – The Standing Committee on Scrutiny and Constitutional Affairs opens the case to decide whether three Supreme Court Justices will be impeached over their involvement in the Fritz Moen wrongful conviction.
 February 14 – A political case centering on Manuela Ramin-Osmundsen forces her to resign from her post as Minister of Children and Equality and Ida Hjort Kraby to resign from her newly appointed position as Ombudsman for Children in Norway.
 February 21 – An earthquake measuring 6.1 on the moment magnitude scale hits Svalbard. This oblique-slip shock had a maximum Mercalli intensity of IV (Light) and was the strongest earthquake ever to hit Norway.
 February 23 – The 8 km Eiksund Tunnel near Volda in Møre og Romsdal is opened.
 February 26 – The Svalbard Global Seed Vault is officially opened.
 28 February – Three people were arrested in Oslo, accused of having participated in the financing of terrorist acts abroad.
 February 29 – Anniken Huitfeldt is appointed Minister of Children and Equality.
 February – Former Prime Minister Gro Harlem Brundtland is entangled in a political scandal over cancer treatments paid for by the Norwegian state, which she was not entitled to having previously changed her residency abroad.

March
 March 1 – Austrian Matthias Lanzinger collides with a gate during a World Cup Super-G run at Kvitfjell, resulting in injuries that lead to his left leg being amputated below the knee two days later.
 28 March – Norway recognizes Kosovo as an independent state.

April
 12 April – Official opening of the Oslo Opera House.

May
 15 May – Ingeborg Synnøve Midtømme is appointed bishop of the diocese of Møre.

June
 June 11 – Norway legalises same-sex marriage.
 September – 2008 psychic phone call controversy: it was revealed that the Norwegian politician Saera Khan had racked up extremely high phone bills using the mobile phone with which she was provided for free by the Parliament.

July

August

September
 September 9 – The OBX Index drops 5.57%, then the fourth biggest drop ever.
 September 29 – In conjunction with the financial crisis of 2007–2008 the OBX Index of the Oslo Stock Exchange drops 8.3%, then its third largest drop ever in one day, but eclipsed only one week later.

October
 October 6 – The OBX Index drops 9.71%, the third largest drop ever in one day.
 October 8 – The OBX Index drops 6.44%
 October – Bangladeshi-Norwegian parliamentarian for the Labour Party Saera Khan withdraws her candidacy for next year's elections when it is revealed that she has spent large sums using her parliament paid-for mobile phone to call psychic hotlines and then consistently lied to cover up the fact.
 October – Controversy erupts when British writer and Holocaust denier David Irving is invited to the 2009 Norwegian Festival of Literature at Lillehammer, to discuss his concept of truth, ending in Irving's invitation being withdrawn. Author Stig Sæterbakken resigns as the festival's content director in protest over the decision.
 October 15 – The OBX Index drops 8.81%
 October 24 – The OBX Index drops 9.24%

November

December
 December 13 – Six people died in a fire in an apartment building in Oslo.
 December 29 - 2008–09 Oslo riots starts.

Popular culture

Sports
 October – Tromsø's bid to become host city to the 2018 Winter Olympics is cancelled when the sports board of Norwegian Confederation of Sports votes 9 against 3 to withdraw the application for government financial guarantee.

Music

 Norway in the Eurovision Song Contest 2008

Film

Literature

 Headhunters - Jo Nesbø

Television

Anniversaries
 200 years since the birth of the poet Henrik Wergeland on June 17, 1808
 100 years since Norway national football team played its first international game on July 12, 1908, in Gothenburg, Sweden
 100 years since the sports club SK Brann was established (September 26).
 100 years since the birth of the poet Olav H. Hauge on August 18, 1908
 100 years since the birth of the composer and pianist Geirr Tveitt October 19, 1908
 70 years since the death of Queen Maud of Norway on November 20, 1938

Sport

 January – The 2008 European Men's Handball Championship is hosted by the Norwegian Handball Federation with venues in Bergen, Drammen, Lillehammer, Stavanger and Trondheim.

Notable births
 September 29 – Emma Tallulah Behn, the daughter of Princess Märtha Louise of Norway and Ari Behn.

Notable deaths

 3 January – Bjarne Aagaard Strøm, politician (b. 1920).
 4 January – Bjørn Odmar Andersen, footballer (b. 1943).
 13 January – Ragnhild Langmyr, painter (b. 1907).
 14 January – Ingvar Heggsum, painter (b. 1918).
 14 January – Bjørn Paulson, high jumper and jurist (b. 1923).
 14 January – Carsten Thomassen, journalist, killed in terrorist attack (b. 1969).
 19 January – Astrid Løken, entomologist (b. 1911)
 23 January – Stein Rønning, karateka (b. 1965).
 23 January – Odd Henrik Sælen, oceanographer (b. 1920).
 24 January – Johannes Heggland, author and politician (b. 1919).
 26 January – Einar Sverre Pedersen, aviator (b. 1919).
 26 January – Einar Løchen, Supreme Court justice (b. 1918).
 28 January – Dagfinn Grønoset, author (b. 1920).
 28 January – Marie Takvam, author and actor (b. 1926).
 30 January – Knut Haugmark, actor (b. 1952).
 9 February – Nils Retterstøl, psychiatrist (b. 1924).
 10 February – Ove Jørstad, footballer (b. 1970).
 10 February – Arne Barhaugen, Nordic combined skier (b. 1932).
 13 February – Thorvald Gressum, politician (b. 1914).
 15 February – Inge Thun, footballer (b. 1945).
 15 February – Magnar Hellebust, politician (b. 1914).
 16 February – Per Erik Monsen, politician (b. 1946).
 22 February – Gerd Olaug Berger, politician (b. 1915).
 4 March – Bjørn Jenseg, actor (b. 1932).
 5 March – Erik Wiik-Hansen, yacht racer (b. 1934).
 7 March – Julius Paltiel, Holocaust survivor (b. 1924).
 10 March – Marianne Gullestad, social anthropologist (b. 1946).
 12 March – Steinar Kvale, psychologist (b. 1938).
 14 March – Ingvald Ulveseth, politician (b. 1924).
 14 March – Harald Trefall, anti-immigration activist (b. 1925).
 14 March – Guri Tambs-Lyche, activist (b. 1917).
 15 March – Fredrik Friis, impresario (b. 1923).
 16 March – Victor Sparre, artist (b. 1919).
 18 March – Bjørg Gaselle, children's writer (b. 1923, died in Spain).
 19 March – Eivind Solberg, jazz trumpeter (b. 1933).
 20 March – John Willem Gran, Catholic bishop (b. 1920, died in France).
 22 March – Arne Skarpsno, "father of the street children" (b. 1926).
 24 March – Odin Sivertsen, politician (b. 1914).
 26 March – Sigmund Strømme, book publisher (b. 1923).
 28 March – Knut Lier-Hansen, resistance member (b. 1916).
 30 March – Halvor Roll, writer (b. 1929).
 30 March – Aage Vestøl, chess player (b. 1922).
 31 March – Stein Haugen, discus thrower (b. 1933).
 5 April – Oskar Edøy, politician (b. 1916).
 9 April – Haaken A. Christensen, art collector (b. 1924).
 11 April – Magne Haraldstad, politician (b. 1937).
 19 April – Klaus Halvorsen, politician (b. 1942).
 21 April – Ola M. Hestenes, politician (b. 1919)
 23 April – Haagen Ringnes, journalist and author (b. 1928).
 29 April – Julie Ege, actress and model (b. 1943).
 3 May – Åge Standal Holter, scholar of religion (b. 1919).
 5 May – Astrid Gunhilde Karlsen, politician (b. 1920).
 10 May – Erik Borge, film director and producer (b. 1924).
 15 May – Tove Billington Bye, politician (b. 1928).
 15 May – Ottar Grønvik, philologist and runologist (b. 1916).
 18 May – Odd Strand, civil servant (b. 1925)
 19 May – Kjell Kristian Rike, sports commentator (b. 1944).
 29 May – Torbjørg Aas Gravalid, fiddler (b. 1916).
 2 June – Geir Kjetsaa, literary historian, translator and author (b. 1937).
 8 June – Tore Falch Nilsen, ice hockey player (b. 1948).
 9 June – Christian Lerche, physician (b. 1917).
 11 June – Gunnar Solum, politician (b. 1929).
 13 June – Per Fuglum, historian (b. 1924).
 15 June – Ole-Jørgen Nilsen, actor and theatre director (b. 1936).
 19 June – Antonio Bibalo, pianist and composer (b. 1922).
 22 June – Odd Aukrust, economist (b. 1915).
 22 June – Jens Petter Ekornes, entrepreneur and politician (b. 1942).
 22 June – Hans Haga, agrarian leader (b. 1924).
 22 June – Einar W. Sissener, businessperson (b. 1929)
 24 June – Kari Røhmen Langaas, painter and printmaker (b. 1920).
 26 June – Asbjørn Haugstvedt, politician (b. 1926).
 27 June – Sasha Gabor, pornographic actor (b. 1945).
 29 June – Jørn Skille, civil servant (b. 1942).
 30 June – Annemarie Lorentzen, politician (b. 1921).
 2 July – Per Andersson, architect and city planner (b. 1921).
 3 July – Harald Heide-Steen Jr., actor, comedian and singer (b. 1939).
 5 July – Dagfinn Næss, boxer (b. 1934).
 8 July – Erling Rønneberg, resistance member and politician (b. 1923).
 8 July – Knut Bøckman, chess writer (b. 1932)
 9 July – Hans Hjelle, politician (b. 1916).
 10 July – Kåre Rodahl, physician (b. 1917).
 14 July – Henki Kolstad, actor (b. 1915).
 21 July – Knut Boye, civil economist (b. 1937).
 25 July – Roy Blohm, painter (b. 1922).
 30 July – Erik Himle, civil servant and politician (b. 1924).
 30 July – Terje Thoen, ice hockey player (b. 1944).
 1 August – Tore Breda Thoresen, theatre director (b. 1924).
 1 August – Rolf Bae, mountaineer (b. 1975, died in Pakistan).
 2 August – Helga Gitmark, politician (b. 1929).
 2 August – Kåre Grøndahl Hagem, politician (b. 1915).
 8 August – Ann-Mari Aasland, politician (b. 1915).
 12 August – Helge Hagerup, writer (b. 1933).
 15 August – Thor Pedersen, rower (b. 1924).
 18 August – Ole Frithjof Klemsdal, politician (b. 1923).
 31 August – Ragnhild Mikkelsen, speed skater (b. 1931).
 1 September – Jens Sterri, civil servant (b. 1923).
 2 September – Andreas Zeier Cappelen, politician (b. 1915).
 6 September – Aril Edvardsen, evangelical preacher and missionary (b. 1938, died in Kenya).
 11 September – Nils Johan Ringdal, historian (b. 1952, died in Indonesia).
 14 September – Knut S. Heier, geochemist (b. 1929)
 20 September – Arne Haugestad, barrister (b. 1935).
 27 September – Olaf Poulsen, speed skater and official (b. 1920)
 28 September – Ivar Kåre Mathisen, politician (b. 1921).
 5 October – Erik Hultberg, architect (b. 1931).
 6 October – Anne Margrethe Strømsheim, resistance member (b. 1914)
 7 October – Ivar Mathisen, canoeist (b. 1920).
 12 October – Vessa Hanssen, opera singer (b. 1937).
 14 October – Bodil Finsveen, politician (b. 1934).
 18 October – Tormod Haugen, author (b. 1945).
 21 October – Helge Fæhn, theologian (b. 1918).
 23 October – Liv Marit Moland, politician (b. 1948).
 30 October – Nils Kåre Jacobsen, publisher (b. 1929).
 31 October – John Klemetsen, boxing coach and promoter (b. 1938).
 8 November – Bodil Aakre, jurist and politician (b. 1922).
 14 November – Knut Bjørnsen, sports commentator and television presenter (b. 1932).
 24 November – Rolf Ketil Bjørn, businessperson and politician (b. 1938).
 13 December – Kjartan Slettemark, artist (b. 1932, died in Sweden).
 15 December – Anne-Catharina Vestly, children's author (b. 1920).
 23 December – Frank Krog, actor (b. 1954).
 23 December – Paul M. Strande, military officer (b. 1912).
 27 December – Arild Andresen, footballer and ice hockey player (b. 1928)

Full date missing
 Torbjørn Kristoffer Christiansen, diplomat (b. 1924).
 Bjørg Arisland, children's writer (b. 1929).
 Ruth Rye Josefsen, politician (b. 1923).
 Kjell Bygstad, politician (b. 1938).
 Torstein Bertelsen, ophthalmologist (b. 1923).
 Sigmund Kjos, industrialist and politician (b. 1931).
 Arnfinn Karlstad, ski jumper (b. 1932).
 Reidun Nortvedt, novelist (b. 1947).
 Gerd Pettersen, resistance member (b. 1914).
 Jon Strømsheim, politician (b. 1915).
 Hans Svartdahl, Pentecostal leader (b. 1920).
 Brit Sørensen, sculptor (b. 1923).
 Rolf Trøen, speed skater (b. 1935).
 Thor Volla, principal (b. 1929).
 Tor Vaa, sculptor (b. 1928).
 Torbjørn "Tobben" Willassen, musician (b. 1949).

References

External links